Pichugin is a rural locality (a khutor) in Zimnyatskoye Rural Settlement, Serafimovichsky District, Volgograd Oblast, Russia. The population was 119 as of 2010. There are 3 streets.

Geography 
Pichugin is located 15 km northeast of Serafimovich (the district's administrative centre) by road. Podolkhovsky is the nearest rural locality.

References 

Rural localities in Serafimovichsky District